Matt Bai (born September 9, 1968) is an American journalist, author and screenwriter. He is a contributing columnist for the Washington Post. Between 2014 and 2019 he was the national political columnist for Yahoo! News. On 25 July 2019, via Twitter, Bai announced he was leaving Yahoo! News to "focus on screenwriting". For more than a decade prior to that, he was the chief political correspondent for the New York Times Magazine, where he covered three presidential campaigns, as well as a columnist for the Times. His cover stories in the magazine include the 2008 cover essay "Is Obama the End of Black Politics?” and a 2004 profile of John Kerry titled "Kerry’s Undeclared War". His work was honored in two editions of The Best American Political Writing. Bai is a graduate of the College of Arts and Sciences at Tufts University in Medford, MA and Columbia's Graduate School of Journalism, where the faculty awarded him the Pulitzer Traveling Fellowship. In 2014, Bai had two brief appearances as himself in the second season of TV show House of Cards.

Journalism career 
He began his career as a speechwriter for the U.S. Committee for UNICEF, writing for Audrey Hepburn, among others, and his international coverage includes reporting from Liberia and Iraq.

Before joining the New York Times Magazine, Bai was city desk reporter for the Boston Globe and a national correspondent for Newsweek magazine. In 2001, Bai was a fellow at the Institute of Politics at Harvard's Kennedy School of Government, where he led a seminar on the next generation of political journalism. He has also been a fellow at the Hoover Institution at Stanford and the Institute of Politics at the University of Chicago.

Other work by Bai for the New York Times Magazine has included cover stories on John McCain's philosophy about war and Barack Obama's strategy to win over white men, as well as a much-discussed cover essay, "Is Obama the End of Black Politics?”. During the 2008 primaries, Bai wrote an online blog, The Primary Argument, on The New York Times website. He also wrote a personal essay about his Japanese American in-laws for the anthology I Married My Mother-in-Law: And Other Tales of In-Laws We Can’t Live With—and Can’t Live Without (Riverhead Books, 2006).

In a 2007 interview with the Progressive Book Club, Bai said his political work is more influenced by novelists writing about urban decline in America than by other political writers. "I think novelists have done a better job on the whole of describing the confusing moment we’re in, in this post-industrial era", he said. "Writers like Philip Roth, Richard Russo (especially Empire Falls and Nobody’s Fool and The Risk Pool), Richard Ford (especially The Sportswriter)—they’ve really tapped into a deep confusion."

Books
Bai's first book, The Argument, published in August 2007, is an account of the "new progressive movement" in America and the people who built it. The Argument was the only political book to be named a New York Times Notable Book for 2007.

His second book, All the Truth Is Out: The Week Politics Went Tabloid, was published by Alfred A. Knopf in 2014. It revisits the 1987 media scandalization of then-candidate Gary Hart. Part history, part memoir and part cultural critique, the book was seen as a sharp critique of his own industry. Bai discussed this aspect of the book on The Daily Show with Jon Stewart and on NPR's Fresh Air, among other venues. Reviewing All the Truth Is Out in The New York Times, Jack Shafer called it "a mini classic of political journalism". The New Yorker'''s media critic, Ken Auletta, wrote, "Bai’s superb book provokes many questions, and I gulped it down in a single sitting".

Movies and television
Bai co-wrote the screenplay for The Front Runner, the cinematic version of All the Truth Is Out, along with the screenwriter Jay Carson and the film's director Jason Reitman. Starring Hugh Jackman, Vera Farmiga and J. K. Simmons, The Front Runner completed filming in Georgia in November 2017 and was released in November 2018. Another screenplay written by Bai and Carson, which tells the story of a massive class action suit against Chevron in Ecuador, was honored on the Hollywood Black List in 2016. Bai has also written for television, and in 2014 he played himself in two episodes of the hit Netflix series House of Cards, as part of a season-long storyline involving a magazine story he was writing in the show.

Notes

Further reading
American Prospect, 1 September 2007, "Ready to Rumble," p. 37.
Booklist, 1 September 2007, Vanessa Bush, review of The Argument: Billionaires, Bloggers, and the Battle to Remake Democratic Politics, p. 24.
Book World, 23 September 2007, "The New Democrats," p. 4.
Commentary, October 2007, Dan DiSalvo, review of The Argument.

Mother Jones, 1 September 2007, Josh Harkinson, review of The Argument.
New York Times Book Review, 28 August 2007, Michiko Kakutani, review of The Argument; 2 September 2007, Nick Gillespie, review of The Argument.
Publishers Weekly, 20 December 2004, "Also at Holt, Vanessa Mobley Signed New York Times Magazine Political Writer Matt Bai for a Book about the Search by the Democrats for a New Approach in the Wake of Their Election Defeat," p. 10.
Talk of the Nation, 20 August 2007, "Democratic Party Lacks Message, Author Says."

Weekend Edition Sunday, 20 January 2008, "Can Democrats Recapture the South?"

External links
 
 The Primary Argument, Bai's New York Times'' blog
 
 Bai answers questions about the media and politics at The Big Think
 Matt Bai’s book talk at Politics & Prose in Washington, podcast, National Public Radio

1968 births
Living people
People from Trumbull, Connecticut
People from Bethesda, Maryland
Tufts University alumni
Columbia University Graduate School of Journalism alumni
UNICEF Goodwill Ambassadors
The Boston Globe people
Harvard Kennedy School staff
Newsweek people
The New York Times writers
Yahoo! News
American speechwriters
American male screenwriters
American political writers
American male non-fiction writers
Screenwriters from New York (state)
Screenwriters from Connecticut
Screenwriters from Maryland